Charles Smith ("C.S.") Hyman,  (August 31, 1854 – October 8, 1926) was a Canadian businessman, and notable politician and sportsman. He was a popular tennis player and won a record five Canadian Opens until broken by Ivan Lendl with six titles.

Early life and business
Born in London, Canada West, the son of Ellis Walton Hyman, a tanner and entrepreneur, and Annie Maria Niles, he was educated at Hellmuth Academy in London and then started a shoe factory with his father in 1874. In 1876, he married Elizabeth Birrell, and two years they had Idlewyld mansion built, which is now an inn.  Hyman was president of the London Board of Trade from 1881 to 1882.  In 1916 he built a summer estate in Port Stanley Ontario on the shore of Lake Erie.  He was also a tannery owner.

Politics
Hyman was elected to London city council in 1882 and was mayor in 1884. He first ran as a Liberal candidate against John Carling for the House of Commons of Canada in the 1887 election for the riding of London and was defeated.

Hyman ran again in 1891 and was elected but the election was declared void and he was defeated in the resulting 1892 by-election. After losing again in 1896, he was elected in 1900 and was re-elected in 1904. From 1904 to 1905, he was a Minister without Portfolio. From 1905 to 1907, he was the Minister of Public Works. He resigned in 1907.

Sports
Hyman was an early Canadian tennis champion, capturing the national tennis championship (which has since evolved into the current Rogers Cup) 5 times in singles – for 1884, and for each year from 1886 through 1889.  (Only Ivan Lendl surpassed this winning 6 titles from 1980 to 1989.) Hyman also captured two doubles titles, the 1886 final partnering I.F. Hellmuth, and the 1889 final playing alongside R.S. Wood.  (No one has ever won a total of seven titles.)

Hyman was also an early captain of the Canada national cricket team, quite possibly when on its 1887 England Tour.

Hyman is said to have introduced the game bridge to Canada.

References

External links
 
 
 The Canadian parliamentary companion, 1891, JA Gemmill

19th-century Canadian people (post-Confederation)
19th-century male tennis players
19th-century Canadian politicians
Businesspeople from London, Ontario
Canadian Anglicans
Canadian male tennis players
Liberal Party of Canada MPs
Mayors of London, Ontario
Members of the House of Commons of Canada from Ontario
Members of the King's Privy Council for Canada
Sportspeople from London, Ontario
1854 births
1926 deaths
Cricketers from Ontario
19th-century Canadian businesspeople